Didem Akay, (b. 1994 - d. 2019 in Istanbul) was a Turkish transgender woman and human rights activist who ended her life due to transphobia and social pressure and became the victim of hate crime. She was the closest friend of Hande Kader, who was murdered in 2016 as a hate crime.

Akay became a symbol of the LGBT community for millions after she was photographed with Hande Kader at the forefront of the resistance against police forces when the 2015 Istanbul Pride event in Istanbul was suppressed by the police.

In 2018, Didem Akay was chosen Turkey's Trans Beauty of the year.

She ended her life in a hotel room in 2019 due to transphobic pressure and psychological trauma.

References

Transgender people
LGBT
LGBT in Turkey
Human rights in Turkey
Transgender women